Khar Zar is a village in Bamyan Province in central Afghanistan.

Notable people from Khar Zar
Mir Yazdanbakhsh, a powerful Hazara chieftain of the early 19th century.

See also
Bamyan Province

References

External links
Satellite map at Maplandia.com

Populated places in Bamyan Province